Tim Leyendekker is a Dutch film director and writer. He is best known for his debut feature film, Feast, and the short films, The Healers and BLINDER.

Career
Leyendekker earned his Master of Fine Arts degree from the Sandberg Institute in Amsterdam and studied at the Willem de Kooning Academy in Rotterdam.

Leyendekker's debut feature film, Feast, had its world premiere at the International Film Festival Rotterdam. His work has also been shown in various art institutions such as Power Plant Contemporary Art Gallery, MMX Open Art Venue, W139 and Museum Boijmans Van Beuningen.

Filmography

Awards and nominations

References

External links
 
 

Living people
1973 births
Dutch film directors
Dutch film producers
Dutch male screenwriters
Dutch screenwriters